was a butterfly swimmer from Japan. He won the silver medal in the men's 200 m butterfly at the 1956 Summer Olympics in Melbourne, Australia. In the late 1950s, he broke the world record in the men's 100m butterfly several times.

References

 databaseOlympics

1935 births
2009 deaths
World record setters in swimming
Olympic silver medalists for Japan
Olympic swimmers of Japan
Swimmers at the 1956 Summer Olympics
Asian Games medalists in swimming
Swimmers at the 1958 Asian Games
Medalists at the 1956 Summer Olympics
Asian Games gold medalists for Japan
Japanese male butterfly swimmers
Olympic silver medalists in swimming
Medalists at the 1958 Asian Games
20th-century Japanese people
21st-century Japanese people